The 2022–23 Botola Pro, also known as Botola Pro Inwi for sponsorship reasons, is the 66th season of the Premier League and the 12th under its new format of Moroccan Pro League, the top Moroccan professional league for association football clubs, since its establishment in 1956.

Wydad Casablanca came into the season as defending champions of the 2021–22 season. Moghreb Tétouan and Union de Touarga entered as the two promoted teams from the 2021–22 Botola 2.

Teams

Stadium and locations

Number of teams by regions

Personnel and kits 

1. On the back of shirt.
2. On the sleeves.
3. On the shorts.  
Additionally, referee kits are made by Puma.

Managerial changes

Foreign players 
All teams are allowed to register up to five foreign players, but can only use up to three players on the field at the same time.

Players name in bold indicates the player is registered during the mid-season transfer window.

League table

Results

Positions by round
The table lists the positions of teams after each week of matches.

Season statistics

Top goalscorers

1 Sahd played for JS Soualem until matchday 11 and scored 5 goals.

Top assists

Hat-tricks

(H) – Home ; (A) – Away
4 – Player scored four goals.

Clean Sheets

Goals-to-Games Ratio

Scoring
First goal of the season:
 Ayoub Lakhdar for HUS Agadir against RS Berkane (1 September 2022)

Last goal of the season:

Discipline

Player 
 Most yellow cards: 7
  Larbi Naji (AS FAR)
  Mohamed Kamal (MA Tetouan)

 Most red cards: 2
  Mouhcine Erbibi (JS Soualem)
  Mohammed Ali Bemammer (Maghreb AS)
  Haytem Aina (Maghreb AS)

Club 
 Most yellow cards: 55
 US Touarga
 Most red cards: 8
 US Touarga
 Fewest yellow cards: 32
 SCC Mohammédia
 Fewest red cards: 1
 Fath US
 MC Oujda
 Raja CA
 SCC Mohammédia

See also
2023 Arab Club Champions Cup
2022 FIFA Club World Cup
2022 CAF Super Cup
2022–23 CAF Champions League
2022–23 CAF Confederation Cup
2022–23 Botola 2
2022–23 Moroccan Amateur National Championship
2021–22 Moroccan Throne Cup

References

External links 
frmf.ma

Morocco
Botola seasons
Botola
Botola